Bryan Townsend (c. 1660–1726) was an Irish politician and sailor.

He was the second son of Richard Townsend and his wife Mary Hyde. Towsend served in the Royal Navy and commanded HMS Swiftsure. He entered the Irish House of Commons in 1695, representing Clonakilty until 1699.

In 1681, he married Mary Synge, daughter of Edward Synge, Bishop of Cork, Cloyne and Ross, and by her he had four daughters and nine sons. His grandsons were Richard Townsend and John Townsend.

References

1660s births
1726 deaths
Irish MPs 1695–1699
Members of the Parliament of Ireland (pre-1801) for County Cork constituencies